Paratheocris olivacea is a species of beetle in the family Cerambycidae. It was described by Stephan von Breuning in 1938. It is known from Gabon.

References

Endemic fauna of Gabon
Theocridini
Beetles described in 1938